Rob Eiter (born September 12, 1967, in Chicago, Illinois) is an American Olympic wrestler. He competed in the 1996 Summer Olympics in Atlanta, Georgia, where he wrestled in the 48 kilogram (105 pound) weight class.  He wrestled for Sunkist Wrestling Club and attended Arizona State University, where he wrestled under Bobby Douglass.  He became head wrestling coach of the University of Pennsylvania in 2008. He was the assistant wrestling coach at the University of Maryland.

Accomplishments 
Wrestling
Five time US Open National Champion
Two time World Cup silver medalist
Member of 1993 and 1995 World Championship teams
Member of 1996 Olympic team

Coaching
Coached the 1999 women's World Championship team
Assistant at Clarion University from 1993 to 1998
Assistant at Northwestern University
Head coach at University of Pennsylvania
Previously Assistant Coach at University of Maryland

References

1967 births
Living people
Sportspeople from Chicago
Wrestlers at the 1996 Summer Olympics
American male sport wrestlers
Olympic wrestlers of the United States